Auvers-le-Hamon is a commune in the Sarthe department in the region of Pays de la Loire in north-western France.

Geography
The Vaige forms part of the commune's south-western border.

See also
Communes of the Sarthe department

References

Communes of Sarthe